Kosis is a settlement in the ǁKaras Region of southern Namibia, situated approximately 120 km west of Keetmanshoop, not far from Bethanie.

References

Populated places in the ǁKaras Region